is the 12th studio album by Japanese entertainer Miho Nakayama. Released through King Records on July 18, 1990, the album features the singles "Megamitachi no Bōken" and "Kore kara no I Love You".

The album peaked at No. 3 on Oricon's albums chart and sold over 112,000 copies.

Track listing

Charts

References

External links
 
 
 

1990 albums
Miho Nakayama albums
Japanese-language albums
King Records (Japan) albums